Pedro Alejandro González Vera (born 17 October 1967 in Valdivia) is a Chilean football manager and former football player nicknamed "Heidi". With 212 goals, he is the second highest scorer in the history of Chilean football after Francisco "Chamaco" Valdés, who has 215 official goals.

International career
González represented Chile at under-20 level in the both 1987 South American Championship and the 1987 FIFA World Youth Championship. At senior level, he earned 29 caps and scored 5 goals from 1993 to 2000.

Managerial career
After working for seven years in the Unión Española youth system, in August 2018 González became the General Manager of the Deportes Valdivia youth system and the coach of the under-19 level team. In 2019, he coached the first team for three months, returning to the youth system in August of the same year.

Honours

Club
Deportes Valdivia
 Segunda División de Chile (1): 1987

Universidad de Chile
 Primera División de Chile (2): 1999, 2000
 Copa Chile (2): 1998, 2000

Individual
 Primera División de Chile Top-scorer (2): 1998, 2000

References

External links

1967 births
Living people
People from Valdivia
Chilean footballers
Chile international footballers
Chile under-20 international footballers
Deportes Valdivia footballers
Unión Española footballers
Coquimbo Unido footballers
Cobreloa footballers
Universidad de Chile footballers
Santiago Morning footballers
Primera B de Chile players
Chilean Primera División players
Chilean football managers
Deportes Valdivia managers
Primera B de Chile managers
Association football forwards